Anti-Finnish sentiment (sometimes known as Fennophobia) is the hostility, prejudice, discrimination or racism directed against Finns, Finland, or Finnish culture.

Britain 
The Finnish people have been discriminated in Britain during Brexit, especially for speaking a different language. For example Finnish people inside trains have been commanded to leave for speaking the Finnish language. Finnish people have been also commanded to leave the country and blocked from getting jobs.

Estonia 
In recent years anti-Finnish sentiment has grown in Estonia, particularly in areas with many Finnish tourists and residents.

Finnish tourists and residents have experienced verbal harassment and at times physical violence.

Norway
Finns have been emigrating to Norway since at least the 11th century. There exists a Finnish minority in Norway, the Kvens. Speaking a Finnish dialect or a closely related Finnic language (their form of speech is now called Kven) was forbidden in Norway, and they experienced discrimination. Before WW2, Norway feared mass immigration and invasion from Finland. This was used as an excuse to discriminate against Kvens.

Russia and the Soviet Union 
The Russian word "chukhna" is a derogatory term for Finnish and Finnic people. The ministry for foreign affairs of Russia called for Russians to not use the word.

Ingrian Finns were heavily persecuted in Soviet Russia, including being subject to forced deportations. 8,000–25,000 Finns were killed during the Great Purge, including the Finnish Operation of the NKVD.

Sweden
During the 1960s and 1970s there was a significant influx of Finnish economic migrants into Sweden. Between 1950 and 1980 the number of Finns in Sweden increased from 45,000 to over 300,000. Attitudes towards Finnish immigrants were quite negative in Sweden. Derogatory expressions "en finne igen" ("yet another Finn") and "finnjävel" (equivalent to "Finnish bastard" or "Finnish devil") were commonly used. An anthology Finnjävlar was published, in which 15 Finns in Sweden describe their lives and lives of their parents in Sweden. In Sweden also the Tornedalians were once seen as an inferior race and speaking Finnish was banned in school.

Both Finnish and Meänkieli (spoken in Tornedal) became official minority languages of Sweden in 2000, and the Swedish state started an investigation about the historical treatment of Finns and Tornedalians in 2020.

Finnjävel

Finnjävel (singular) and Finnjävlar (plural) are derogatory terms used in Sweden for Finnish immigrants, mostly during the 1950s and 1960s. In this context, jävel or djävel, literally meaning "devil", is a generic strong insult.

United States

The prominent role of Finnish immigrants in the 1907 and 1916 Mesabi Range strikes in Minnesota led to blacklisting of Finns. It was the time of anti-Finnish sentiment in the area, and one could see signs "No Indians or Finns allowed." When many Finns came to America they started to set up schools, saunas and political unions, and the involvement in unions caused a bad reputation to Finnish people. Finns also had problems learning English and because they were "new" Finns faced much discrimination. The fact that the Finnish language is a Finno-Ugric language and not related to most other European languages, was used as proof that the Finns were not European and thus a fair subject to discrimination.

China Swede 
China Swede was a derogatory term used for Finnish immigrants in the United States during the early 1900s, particularly in northern Minnesota and Upper Michigan. Another term was "roundhead".

Jackpine savage 

The term jackpine savage was used in northern Minnesota during the early 1900s, referring to the term Indian savage used of Native Americans. Finnish businesses were also harassed with the pretext that they were illegally dealing liquor to Native Americans.

Åland 
In Åland Finnish people are sometimes discriminated against and insults like Finnjävel ”Finnish devil” are used against Finns.

See also
Chukhna
Lynching of Olli Kinkkonen
Mesaba Co-op Park
Russification of Finland
Genocide of the Ingrian Finns

References

Further reading
Aleksi Huhta, Debating Visibility: Race and Visibility in the Finnish-American Press in 1908, Nordic Journal of Migration Research,  4(4), 2014, 168–175, 

Finnish
Finnish diaspora
Racism
Foreign relations of Finland